Jonathan Felipe Paredes Hernández (born 4 April 1989) is a Colombian professional racing cyclist, who is currently suspended from the sport after testing positive for continuous erythropoietin receptor activator (CERA) at the 2017 Vuelta a Colombia.

References

External links
 

1989 births
Living people
Colombian male cyclists
Sportspeople from Boyacá Department
21st-century Colombian people